Majdan is the name of the following mountains:

 Majdan (mountain in Kosovo)
 Majdan (Serbian mountain)